The Lake Como Golf Club was an Italian golf course, constructed in 1905 in Dervio by Margaret Scott and Frederick Gustavus Hamilton-Russell.

References
 

Golf clubs and courses in Italy